Butler Gilbert Noble (September 27, 1815 – October 25, 1890) was the seventh Lieutenant Governor of Wisconsin under Governor Alexander Randall.

Biography
He was born in Geneva, New York. He moved to Wisconsin in 1850. He soon joined the Republican Party. He served as a member of the Wisconsin State Assembly, from Whitewater, Wisconsin, in 1858, and was elected lieutenant governor at the end of the next year, a position in which he served from 1860 until 1862.  In 1864, he moved to New York City, where he held jobs first as a weigher in the customs house, then as a harbor master, then as chief clerk in the seizure room. He died in 1890, from a stroke, in Brooklyn.

References 

1815 births
1890 deaths
Republican Party members of the Wisconsin State Assembly
Lieutenant Governors of Wisconsin
19th-century American politicians
People from Whitewater, Wisconsin